The 2005 Women's EuroHockey Nations Trophy was the first edition of the Women's EuroHockey Nations Trophy, the second level of the women's European field hockey championships organized by the European Hockey Federation. It was held from 5 to 11 September 2005 in Baku, Azerbaijan.

The hosts Azerbaijan won the first EuroHockey Nations Trophy title and were promoted to the 2007 EuroHockey Championship together with the runners-up Italy.

Results

Preliminary round

Pool A

Pool B

Fifth to eighth place classification

5–8th place semi-finals

Seventh place game

Fifth place game

First to fourth place classification

Semi-finals

Third place game

Final

Final standings

See also
2005 Men's EuroHockey Nations Trophy
2005 Women's EuroHockey Nations Challenge I
2005 Women's EuroHockey Nations Championship

References

Women's EuroHockey Championship II
EuroHockey Nations Trophy
Women 2
EuroHockey Nations Trophy
EuroHockey Nations Trophy
International women's field hockey competitions hosted by Azerbaijan
Sports competitions in Baku
2000s in Baku